Mathieu-Nicolas Poillevillain de Clémanges (or Clamanges) (born in Champagne c. 1360, died in Paris between 1434 and 1440) was a French humanist and theologian.

He studied in the Collège de Navarre, University of Paris, and in 1380 received the degree of Licentiate, and then later received a Master of Arts. He studied theology under Jean Gerson and Pierre d'Ailly, and received the degree of Bachelor of Theology in 1393.

He had begun to lecture at the university in 1391 and was appointed its rector in 1393, a position he filled until 1395. The Church was then agitated by the Western Schism, and three methods were proposed to re-establish peace: compromise, concession, and a general council.

From 1380 to 1394 the University of Paris advocated a general council. In 1394 another tendency was manifest; i.e. both Pope Boniface IX and Pope Clement VII were held responsible for the continuance of the schism, and their resignations decreed to be the means of obtaining peace. To this end a letter was written to King Charles VI by three of the most learned masters of the university, d'Ailly, Clémanges, and Gilles des Champs. Des Champs and d'Ailly prepared the content, to which Clémanges gave a Ciceronian elegance of form. The letter was unsuccessful, and the university was ordered to abstain from further discussion.

Clémanges, forced to resign the rectorship of the university, then became canon and dean of Saint-Clodoald  in 1395, and later on canon and treasurer of Langres. The antipope Benedict XIII, who admired his Latin style, took him for his secretary in 1397, and he remained at Avignon until 1408, when he abandoned Benedict because of the latter's conflict with Charles VI.

Clémanges now retired to the Carthusian monastery of Valfonds, and later to Fontain-au-Bois. In these two retreats he wrote his best treatises, De Fructu eremi (dedicated to Pierre d'Ailly), De Fructu rerum adversarum, De novis festivitatibus non instituendis, and De studio theologico, in which latter work he exhibits his dislike for the Scholastic method in philosophy.

In 1412 he returned to Langres, and was appointed Archdeacon of Bayeux. His voice was heard successively at the Council of Constance (1414), and at Chartres (1421), where he defended the "liberties" of the Gallican Church. In 1425 he was teaching rhetoric and theology in the College of Navarre, where, most probably, he died.

Clémanges is also credited with the authorship of the work De corrupto Ecclesiae statu, first edited by Konrad Cordatus (possibly with Ulrich von Hutten) in 1513, a violent attack on the morality and discipline of the contemporary Church; hence he is sometimes considered a Reformer of the type of Wyclif and Hus. Schubert, however, in his book Ist Nicolaus von Clémanges der Verfasser des Buches De corrupto Ecclesiae statu? (Grossenhain, 1882; Leipzig, 1888) suggested that, although a contemporary, Clémanges was not the author of the book.

His works were edited in two volumes by Johannes Martin Lydius a Protestant minister of Frankfort (Leyden, 1613). His letters are in Luc d'Achery's Spicilegium, volume I, 473 sqq.

Sources

 Bellitto, Christopher, Nicolas de Clamanges: spirituality, personal reform, and pastoral renewal on the eve of the reformations, Washington, DC: Catholic University of America Press, 2001.

Medieval French theologians
University of Paris alumni
French Renaissance humanists
14th-century French people
15th-century French people
French male writers